Metaxin 1, also known as MTX1, is a protein which in humans is encoded by the MTX1 gene.

Function 

The metaxin gene, which encodes a protein located on the outer membrane of mitochondria, is a component of the mitochondrial protein translocation apparatus.

References

Further reading